Loftus railway station is located on the Illawarra line, serving the Sydney suburb of Loftus. It is served by Sydney Trains T4 line services and limited NSW TrainLink South Coast line services.

History
Loftus station opened on 9 March 1886 as Loftus Junction when the Illawarra line was extended from Sutherland to Waterfall. Until September 1896, it was called Loftus Junction. It was rebuilt in 1979 as part of the extension of the electrification from Loftus Junction to Waterfall.

From 1886 until 1991, Loftus was the former junction of the branch line to the Royal National Park which branched off immediately south of the station.

Platforms and services

Transport links
Transdev NSW operates two routes via Loftus station:
991: Sutherland station to Heathcote
993: Westfield Miranda to Woronora Heights

See also

Loftus Junction railway signal box

References

External links

Loftus station details Transport for New South Wales

Railway stations in Sydney
Railway stations in Australia opened in 1886
Illawarra railway line
Sutherland Shire